Danieli may refer to:

People 
 Given name
 Danieli Haloten (born 1980), Brazilian journalist, actress and lecturer 
 Surname
 Cecilia Danieli (1943–1999), Italian entrepreneur and industrialist
 Emma Danieli (1936–1998), Italian actress and television personality
 Francesco Danieli (born 1981), Italian historian and iconologist.
 Isa Danieli (born 1937), Italian film actress
 Nicola Danieli (born 1998), Italian football player
 Otto Danieli, Swiss curler and 1975 World Champion

Other uses 
 Danieli Piuma, a family of Italian high-wing, strut-braced, pusher configuration single-seat motor gliders
 Hotel Danieli, formerly Palazzo Dandolo, is a five-star palatial hotel in Venice, Italy

See also 
 Daniel (disambiguation)